Masterpass is the trademark under which Mastercard provides digital payment services in some markets around the world, which is a digital wallet that allows to pay faster by keeping all the information you need for payment and delivery in one place. It is a universal payment solution that can be integrated into both a website and a mobile application. Despite its name, Masterpass is compatible with more than simply Mastercard products, it allows you to save the data of cards other payment systems. Mastercard does not charge merchant any fees for purchases through Masterpass.

Masterpass users can receive special offers from some of the retailers that accept the payment service. It works similarly to Apple Pay and Google Pay online, so if a website or service hasn't already added support, Masterpass won't change that.

See also
 Click to Pay
 Visa Checkout
 Apple Wallet
 Google Wallet
 Samsung Pay

References

External links
 
 

Mastercard
Online payments